Different styles of dance have their own terminology.  The following articles contain information on dance terms:

 Glossary of ballet terms
 Glossary of belly dance terms
 Glossary of country dance terms
 Glossary of dance moves
 Glossary of partner dance terms